Trabea (plural trabeae) is the name of various pieces of Roman clothing. A distinct feature of all trabeae was their color – usually red or purple. They were formed like a toga and possibly in some cases like a mantle and worn by more distinguished members of Roman society.

A garment known as the trabea triumphalis was commonly worn by consuls in Late Antiquity. When Emperor Justinian II abolished the office of consul as a separate entity from the Emperor himself, the trabea triumphalis developed into the loros, which was the worn only by the imperial family and senior administrative officials. Although Emperor Leo VI abolished the ancient title of consul altogether, the loros persisted until the end of the empire as the formal, ceremonial dress of the emperors.

See also 
 Clothing in ancient Rome

References
Philip Smith: Toga. In: William Smith (Hrsg.): A Dictionary of Greek and Roman Antiquities. John Murray, London, 1875 (online copy at LacusCurtius)
Liza Cleland, Glenys Davies, Lloyd Llewellyn-Jones: Greek and Roman dress from A to Z. Routledge 2007, p. 197
J. C. Edmondson, Alison Keith: Roman Dress and the Fabrics of Roman Culture. University of Toronto Press 2008, S. 13, 27, 32, 42, 43, 217-237 

External links
Picture of a man dressed with tunica and trabea at roman-empire.net

Roman-era clothing
Dresses